The polar wind or plasma fountain is a permanent outflow of plasma from the polar regions of Earth's magnetosphere, caused by the interaction between the solar wind and the Earth's atmosphere. The solar wind ionizes gas molecules in the upper atmosphere to such high energy that some of them reach escape velocity and pour into space. A considerable percentage of these ions remain bound inside Earth's magnetic field, where they form part of the radiation belts.

The term was coined in 1968 in a pair of articles by Banks and Holzer and by Ian Axford. Since the process by which the ionospheric plasma flows away from the Earth along magnetic field lines is similar to the flow of solar plasma away from the sun's corona (the solar wind), Axford suggested the term "polar wind." The idea for the polar wind originated with the desire to solve the paradox of the terrestrial helium budget. This paradox consists of the fact that helium in the Earth's atmosphere seems to be produced (via radioactive decay of uranium and thorium) faster than it is lost by escaping from the upper atmosphere. The realization that some helium could be ionized, and therefore escape the earth along open magnetic field lines near the magnetic poles (the 'polar wind'), is one possible solution to the paradox.

Further research came from the Retarding Ion Mass Spectrometer instrument on the Dynamics Explorer spacecraft, in the 1980s. Recently, the SCIFER sounding rocket was launched into the plasma heating region of the fountain.

References

Atmosphere